John Irwin Hutchinson (12 April 1867 – 1 December 1935) was an American mathematician born in Bangor, Maine. He was educated at Bates College, (A.B., 1889), Clark University (1890–92), and the University of Chicago (Ph.D., 1896). With Virgil Snyder he was coauthor of Differential and Integral Calculus (1902) and Elementary Treatise on the Calculus (1912).

Books 
 Differential and integral calculus (New York, American Book Company, 1902) 
 Elementary textbook on the calculus. (New York, American Book Company, 1912)

References

Sources 
Obituaries
 Virgil Snyder John Irwin Hutchinson—In memoriam Bull. Amer. Math. Soc. 42, 164, (1936).

19th-century American mathematicians
20th-century American mathematicians
American science writers
1867 births
1935 deaths
Clark University alumni
Cornell University faculty
Bates College alumni
University of Chicago alumni
Mathematics educators
Writers from Bangor, Maine
Mathematicians from Maine